The Last Will of a Russian Fascist is a reprint edition published in 2001 of a book by Konstantin Rodzaevsky, the leader of the All-Russia Fascist Party. Circulation of the book was 12,000 copies, of which 5,000 were a first-edition volume with illustrations, and the remainder were a second-edition volume without illustrations.

Preface

Monograph
The bulk of the book is the monograph by Rodzaevsky "Contemporary Judaisation of the World or the Jewish Question in the 20th Century", published in Harbin in 1943. The monograph is divided into four parts:

"Traveling around the world" discusses political geography and the views of the author regarding the geography of the world in terms of the presence of Jews and the degree of their influence in a country
"Excursion to the story": the author's conception of Jewish history
"World Jewish interstate": the author's conception of the organization of Jewish communities of the world
"The decision of our destiny": the author's opinions about contemporary world events, their causes, and the hidden consequences of the Jewish Policy

Azbuka fashizma
Also included in the book is "Azbuka fashizma" ("The ABC of fascism"), compiled, edited and with additions by Rodzaevsky published in Harbin in 1934. This work represents 100 responses to 100 questions about fascism. At the end of the book, the anthem of the Russian Fascist Party (VFP) is found.

Party documents
In the book published by VFP Program (approved 03/07/1935 in Harbin) and approved by the Supreme Council of 25.10.1936, is included the VFP position papers: "On the party greeting" № 69, "On the party flag of VFP" № 71, "On the National Flag and National Anthem" № 73,  "On the party icon" № 67, "On the party banner" № 72, "On the party and form a hierarchical Signs" № 68 (with appendix – table of hierarchical letters), and "On the religious icon" № 65.

Articles
After the party documents in the book, there are two articles by Aleksey Shiropaev: "Voice of Russian Truth" and "Russian of the future".

Necessary additions
The book includes a statement dated October 4, 1997, concerning the rehabilitation of Rodzaevsky, Lev Okhotin, and others; the definition of the Military Collegium of the Supreme Court of the Russian Federation № 043/46 dated 26.03.1998; the refusal of rehabilitation of Rodzaevsky, Lev Okhotin, and others; as well as the response from the Chief Military Prosecutor's Office on the legality of this definition.

Banned in Russia 
On October 11, 2010, due to a decision by the Central District Court of Krasnoyarsk, the book became recognized in Russia as extremist material, and the book has been included in the Federal List of Extremist Materials (№ 861).

Notes

References
 Звезда и свастика: Большевизм и русский фашизм. М., Терра, 1994
 Н.Е. Аблова. КВЖД и российская эмиграция в Китае. М., Русская панорама, 2004 

2001 books
Fascist books
Fascism in Russia